This is a list of museums in San Diego County, California, defined for this context as institutions (including nonprofit organizations, government entities, and private businesses) that collect and care for objects of cultural, artistic, scientific, or historical interest and make their collections or related exhibits available for public viewing. Also included are non-profit and university art galleries. Museums that exist only in cyberspace (i.e., virtual museums) are not included.

To use the sortable tables: click on the icons at the top of each column to sort that column in alphabetical order; click again for reverse alphabetical order.

Museums

Defunct museums
 Villa Montezuma, San Diego, Friends site, closed in 2006, late 19th-century Queen Anne mansion in Sherman Heights

See also
National Register of Historic Places listings in Imperial County, California
National Register of Historic Places listings in San Diego County, California

References

External links
 Official Travel Resource for the San Diego Region
 County of San Diego Official Website
 San Diego Geographic Information Source Website
 San Diego County Water Authority Map
 California State Association of Counties (CSAC)
 The San Diego Union-Tribune Website
 San Diego Lifestyle Website

San Diego
 
 
Museums